John Carmichael may refer to:

 John Carmichael (VC) (1893–1977), Scottish recipient of the Victoria Cross
 John Carmichael (Scientology) (born 1947), president of the Church of Scientology of New York
 John Carmichael (Canadian politician) (born 1952), Canadian politician
 John Carmichael (Kansas politician) (born 1957), American politician from Kansas
 John Carmichael, 1st Earl of Hyndford (1638–1710), Scottish nobleman and politician
 John Carmichael, 3rd Earl of Hyndford (1701–1767), Scottish nobleman and politician
 Sir John Carmichael (died 1600), Scottish official
 Sir John Carmichael-Anstruther, 5th Baronet (1785–1818), known as John Anstruther until 1817, MP for Anstruther Easter Burghs 1811–1818
 Sir John Carmichael-Anstruther, 6th Baronet (1818–1831), shot dead at Eton College
 John Carmichael (composer) (born 1930), Australian composer and pianist
 John Carmichael (cricketer) (1858–1914), English cricketer
 John Carmichael (sportswriter) (1902–1986), American baseball writer
 John Wilson Carmichael (1799–1868), British marine painter